South Armagh was a UK Parliament constituency in Ireland which returned one Member of Parliament from 1885 to 1922, using the first past the post electoral system.

Boundaries and boundary changes
This constituency comprised the southern part of County Armagh.

From 1885 to 1918 the constituency was bounded to the north and north-west by Mid Armagh, to the south-west by South Monaghan, to the south by North Louth, to the south-east by the Borough of Newry and to the east by South Down. In 1918, that part of the constituency in the urban district of Newry was added to the South Down constituency. Between 1918 and 1922 the neighbouring seats were the same except that Louth was an undivided county constituency and Newry had been absorbed into South Down.

1885–1918: The barony of Orior Upper, and those parts of the baronies of Fews Lower, Fews Upper and Orior Lower not contained within the constituency of Mid Armagh.

1918–1922: That part of the existing South Armagh constituency comprised in the administrative county of Armagh.

Prior to the 1885 United Kingdom general election and from the dissolution of Parliament in 1922 the area was part of the Armagh constituency.

Politics
The constituency was a predominantly Nationalist area. In 1918 the Nationalists heavily defeated Sinn Féin.

The First Dáil
Sinn Féin contested the general election of 1918 on the platform that instead of taking up any seats they won in the United Kingdom Parliament, they would establish a revolutionary assembly in Dublin. In republican theory every MP elected in Ireland was a potential Deputy to this assembly. In practice only the Sinn Féin members accepted the offer.

The revolutionary First Dáil assembled on 21 January 1919 and last met on 10 May 1921. The First Dáil, according to a resolution passed on 10 May 1921, was formally dissolved on the assembling of the Second Dáil. This took place on 16 August 1921.

In 1921 Sinn Féin decided to use the UK authorised elections for the Northern Ireland House of Commons and the House of Commons of Southern Ireland as a poll for the Irish Republic's Second Dáil. This constituency, in republican theory, was incorporated in a four-member Dáil constituency of Armagh.

Members of Parliament

Elections

Elections in the 1880s

Elections in the 1890s

Elections in the 1900s
Seat vacant on dissolution due to the death of McHugh

Death of McKillop

Elections in the 1910s

Death of O'Neill

References

See also
 List of UK Parliament Constituencies in Ireland and Northern Ireland
 Redistribution of Seats (Ireland) Act 1918
 List of MPs elected in the 1918 United Kingdom general election
 List of Dáil Éireann constituencies in Ireland (historic)
 Members of the 1st Dáil

Westminster constituencies in County Armagh (historic)
Dáil constituencies in Northern Ireland (historic)
Constituencies of the Parliament of the United Kingdom established in 1885
Constituencies of the Parliament of the United Kingdom disestablished in 1922